Macomb Reservation State Park is a  state park in the Town of Schuyler Falls in Clinton County, New York, United States.

History
Macomb Reservation State Park occupies land previously used as a military training facility. New York State purchased  of federal property in April 1947,  of which were given over to the New York State Office of Parks, Recreation and Historic Preservation in 1968. The remainder of the purchased property is managed by the New York State Department of Environmental Conservation for the purpose of reforestation.

Park description
The park offers a beach, a playground and playing fields, picnic tables and pavilions, recreation programs, a nature trail, fishing (in Davis Pond or the Salmon River), a boat launch for non-motorized boats, a campground for tents and trailers, a dump station, cross-country skiing, snowshoeing, snowmobiling, and ice-skating.

See also
 List of New York state parks

References

External links
 New York State Parks: Macomb Reservation State Park

State parks of New York (state)
Parks in Clinton County, New York